Leuven was a constituency used to elect members of the Belgian Chamber of Representatives between 1831 and 1999.

Representatives

References

Defunct constituencies of the Chamber of Representatives (Belgium)